Perun was an  monitor built for the Imperial Russian Navy in the mid-1860s. The design was based on the American , but was modified to suit Russian engines, guns and construction techniques. Spending her entire career with the Baltic Fleet, the ship was only active when the Gulf of Finland was not frozen, but very little is known about her service. Perun was struck from the Navy List in 1900 and became a pilot ship. Renamed Lotsiia (Pilot) in 1915, the ship was damaged during the Kronstadt rebellion of 1921 and laid up afterwards. She was run aground by a flood three years later and then her wreck was scrapped.

Description
She displaced , and her crew numbered 8 officers and 88 enlisted men in 1865. They numbered 10 officers and 100 crewmen 12 years later.

The ship was fitted with a two-cylinder, horizontal direct-acting steam engine built by Carr and MacPherson of Saint Petersburg. It drove a single propeller using steam that was provided by two rectangular boilers.

Perun was designed to be armed with a pair of  smoothbore muzzle-loading guns purchased from Krupp of Germany and rifled in Russia, but the rifling project was seriously delayed and the ship was completed with nine-inch smoothbores. These lacked the penetration power necessary to deal with ironclads and they were replaced by license-built  smoothbore muzzle-loading Rodman guns in 1867–68. The Rodman guns were replaced around 1876 with the originally intended nine-inch rifled guns.

All of the wrought-iron armor that was used in the Uragan-class monitors was in  plates, just as in the Passaic-class ships. The gun turret was protected by eleven layers of armor and the pilothouse above it had eight layers of armor. Unlike their predecessors, the Uragans were built without deck armor to save weight.

Career
Construction of the ship began on 7 September 1863 at the Semiannikov & Poletika Shipyard in Saint Petersburg. Perun was laid down on 15 December 1863 and she was launched on 30 June 1864. She entered service on 1 September 1865 and cost a total of 1,142,700 rubles, almost double her contract cost of 600,000 rubles. The ship was assigned to the Baltic Fleet upon completion and she, and all of her sister ships except , made a port visit to Stockholm, Sweden in July–August 1865 while under the command of General Admiral Grand Duke Konstantin Nikolayevich. She was present when the American warships  and  visited Kronstadt in July–August 1866.

Later, an armored, outward-curving bulwark was fitted around the top of the turret to protect any crewmen there. Three sponsons were later added, probably during the 1870s, to the upper portion of the turret. Each sponson, one above the gun ports and one on each side of the turret, mounted a light gun, probably a  Engstrem gun, for defense against torpedo boats. A fourth gun was mounted on a platform aft of the funnel when a hurricane deck was built between the funnel and the turret, also probably during the 1870s.

Little is known about the ship's career other than that she was laid up each winter when the Gulf of Finland froze. On 18 July 1875, she was accidentally rammed by the ironclad , but only suffered minor damage. Perun was reclassified as a coast defense ironclad on 13 February 1892 and turned over to the Port of Kronstadt for disposal on 6 July 1900, although she was not stricken until 17 August. After she was stricken she was used as a pilot ship before being renamed Lotsiia (Pilot) in 1915. During the 1921 Kronstadt rebellion, the ship was struck by artillery fire. She was laid up after the resulting fire badly damaged her. During a flood on 23 September 1924, Lotsiia ran aground and was subsequently broken up for scrap.

Notes

Footnotes

References

Uragan-class monitors
1864 ships
Ships built in Saint Petersburg
Maritime incidents in 1919
Maritime incidents in 1924